Warrior Field is a sports stadium in Waterloo, Ontario with a seated capacity of 1,700 in the grandstand, and 5,700 overall including lawn and endzone areas. It is home to the Waterloo Warriors football, soccer, and field hockey teams while also being available for the school's club teams as well. Warrior Field was built in time for the 2009 season and was renovated further in 2010 with the addition of grandstand seating and area development. Previously, teams played at University Stadium, which is now occupied by Wilfrid Laurier University athletics.

References

External links
 University of Waterloo athletics
 Warrior Field

Canadian football venues in Ontario
Sports venues in Waterloo, Ontario
Athletics (track and field) venues in Ontario
Sport in Waterloo, Ontario
2009 establishments in Ontario
Soccer venues in Ontario
University of Waterloo buildings